Jindřich Jirásek (born 9 September 1973) is a retired Czech football defender.

References

1973 births
Living people
Czech footballers
SK Slavia Prague players
FK Chmel Blšany players
FC Vysočina Jihlava players
FK Dukla Prague players
Association football defenders
Czech First League players